QBN FM 96.7 (call sign: 2QBN) is a community radio station which broadcasts on 96.7MHz from its studios in Crawford street, Queanbeyan in New South Wales, Australia. It is about 15 kilometres southeast from the city of Canberra in the Australian Capital territory. The station's staff and presenters are volunteers, and the station operates as a completely non-profit entity.

QBN FM 96.7 has been on air since April 2000 and holds a  Community Broadcasting Licence (TCBL). The station is also a full member of the Community Broadcasting Association of Australia (CBAA).

QBN FM plays an array of music including, "Classic Pop and Rock from the 60s till today, Traditional and Contemporary Country, Irish Folk, Nostalgia from the 30s to the 50s, Classical Music" In addition to music, the station features artists local to Australia and abroad.

In 2006 QBN FM was nominated for the award at the 2006 Australian Country Recording Awards. "Australian Country radio Station of the Year"

In 2007, the station was investigated for breaching its community radio license. Complaints included rejecting a number of member applications, discrimination and bad management practices.

In 2010 QBN FM was involved with the promotion of children having a good breakfast at the Karabah High school. This helped to create an awareness of the lack of nutrition children were getting before starting school for the day. This program was a government initiative called "the school breakfast program".

References

External links
 official website

Community radio stations in Australia
Radio stations in Canberra
Radio stations established in 2000